John Edward Thaw,  (3 January 1942 – 21 February 2002) was an English actor who appeared in a range of television, stage, and cinema roles. He starred in the television series Inspector Morse as title character Detective Chief Inspector Endeavour Morse, Redcap as Sergeant John Mann, The Sweeney as Detective Inspector Jack Regan, Home to Roost as Henry Willows, and Kavanagh QC as title character James Kavanagh.

Early life
Thaw was born in Gorton, Manchester, to working-class parents John Edward ("Jack") Thaw (died 1997), a tool-setter at the Fairey Aviation Company aircraft factory, later a long-distance lorry driver, and Dorothy (née Ablott). Thaw had a difficult childhood as his mother left when he was seven years old. His younger brother, Raymond Stuart "Ray" emigrated to Australia in the mid-1960s. Thaw grew up in Gorton and Burnage, attending the Ducie Technical High School for Boys. He entered the Royal Academy of Dramatic Art (RADA) at the age of 16.

Career
Soon after leaving RADA, Thaw made his formal stage début in A Shred of Evidence at the Liverpool Playhouse and was awarded a contract with the theatre. His first film role was a bit part in the adaptation of The Loneliness of the Long Distance Runner (1962) starring Tom Courtenay and he also acted on-stage opposite Sir Laurence Olivier in Semi-Detached (1962) by David Turner. He appeared in several episodes of the BBC police series Z-Cars in 1963–64 as a detective constable. Between 1964 and 1966, he starred in two series of the ABC Weekend Television/ITV production Redcap, playing the hard-nosed military policeman Sergeant John Mann. He was also a guest star in an early episode of The Avengers. In 1967 he appeared in Bat Out of Hell. In 1967 he appeared in the Granada TV/ITV series, Inheritance, alongside James Bolam and Michael Goodliffe, as well as appearing in TV plays such as The Talking Head and episodes of series such as Budgie, where he played against type (opposite Adam Faith) as the son of an elderly prostitute Budgie is "noncing" for: an effeminate failed playwright with a full beard and a Welsh accent.

Thaw will perhaps be best remembered for two television roles: the hard-bitten, tough-talking Flying Squad detective Jack Regan in The Sweeney (1975–1978), and the quietly spoken, introspective, well-educated and bitter Detective Chief Inspector Endeavour Morse in Inspector Morse (1987–93, with later specials until 2000).  His role as Regan in the Thames Television/ITV series, along with two film spin-offs, established him as a major star in the United Kingdom. Thaw was only 32 when he was cast in The Sweeney, although many viewers thought he was older.

Alongside his put-upon Detective Sergeant Robert "Robbie" Lewis (Kevin Whately), Morse became a high-profile character—"a cognitive curmudgeon with his love of classical music, his drinking, his classic Jaguar and spates of melancholy". According to The Guardian, "Thaw was the definitive Morse, grumpy, crossword-fixated, drunk, slightly anti-feminist, and pedantic about grammar." Inspector Morse became one of the UK's most loved TV series; at its peak in the mid-90's, ratings hit 18 million people, about one third of the British population. He won "Most Popular Actor" at the 1999 National Television Awards and won two BAFTA awards for his role as Morse.

He subsequently played liberal working-class Lancastrian barrister James Kavanagh in Kavanagh QC (1995–99, and a special in 2001). Thaw also appeared in two sitcoms—Thick as Thieves (London Weekend/ITV, 1974) with Bob Hoskins and Home to Roost (Yorkshire/ITV, 1985–90). Thaw is mainly known in America for the Morse series, as well as the BBC series A Year in Provence (1993) with Lindsay Duncan.

He appeared in a number of films for director Richard Attenborough, including Cry Freedom, where he portrayed the conservative South African justice minister Jimmy Kruger (for which he received a BAFTA nomination for Best Supporting Actor), and Chaplin alongside Robert Downey Jr.

Thaw also appeared in the TV adaptation of the Michelle Magorian book Goodnight Mister Tom (Carlton Television/ITV). It won  "Most Popular Drama" at the National Television Awards, 1999.

During the 1970s and 1980s, Thaw appeared in productions with the Royal Shakespeare Company and National Theatre. He was the subject of This Is Your Life in 1981 when he was surprised by Eamonn Andrews in the foyer of the National Theatre in London.

Personal life
In the summer of 1964, Thaw married Sally Alexander, a feminist activist and theatre stage manager, and now professor of history at Goldsmiths, University of London. They divorced four years later. He met actress Sheila Hancock in 1969 on the set of a London comedy, So What About Love? She was married to fellow actor Alexander "Alec" Ross, and after Thaw professed his love to Hancock, she told him that she would not have an affair. Following the death of her husband (from oesophageal cancer) in 1971, Thaw and Hancock married on 24 December 1973 in Cirencester, and he remained with her until his death in 2002 (also from oesophageal cancer).

He had three daughters (all of whom are actresses): Abigail from his first marriage to Sally Alexander, Joanna from his second marriage to Sheila Hancock, and he also adopted Sheila Hancock's daughter Melanie Jane, from Hancock's first marriage to Alec Ross. Melanie Jane legally changed her surname from Ross to Thaw. His granddaughter Molly Whitmey made a cameo in the Endeavour episode Oracle (series 7, episode 1, broadcast 1 February 2020) as the younger version of her grandmother Sally Alexander.

Thaw was a committed socialist and a lifelong supporter of the Labour Party. He was appointed a Commander of the Most Excellent Order of the British Empire (CBE) in March 1993 by Queen Elizabeth II. In September 2006, Thaw was voted by the general public as number 3, after David Jason and Morecambe and Wise, in a poll of TV's 50 Greatest Stars for the past 50 years.

Illness and death
A heavy drinker until going teetotal in 1995, and a heavy smoker from the age of 12, Thaw was diagnosed with cancer of the oesophagus in June 2001. He underwent chemotherapy in hope of overcoming the illness, and at first had appeared to respond well to the treatment. However, just before Christmas 2001 he was informed that the cancer had spread and the prognosis was terminal.

He died on 21 February 2002, seven weeks after his 60th birthday, the day after he signed a new contract with ITV, and the day before his wife's birthday. At the time of his death he was living at his country home, near the villages of Luckington and Sherston in Wiltshire, and was cremated in Westerleigh, near Yate in South Gloucestershire, in a private service. A memorial service was held on 4 September 2002 at St Martin-in-the-Fields church in Trafalgar Square, attended by 800 people including Charles, Prince of Wales, Richard Attenborough, Tom Courtenay and Cherie Blair.

Television, film and stage performances

Television series

1961: The Younger Generation –  Customer / Max / Edward / Charlie / Peter / Denny / Martin
1963: Edgar Wallace Mysteries (Episode: "Five to One (film)") – Alan Roper
1963: Z Cars: Detective Constable Elliot
1964 to 1966: Redcap (Two Series) – Sergeant John Mann
1965: Edgar Wallace Mysteries (Episode: "Dead Man's Chest") – David Jones
1966: Bat Out of Hell – Mark Paxton
1967: Inheritance – Will Oldroyd
1972. The Frighteners ep.5 (old comrades).
1974: Thick As Thieves – Stan
1974: The Capone Investment – Tom
1975 to 1978: The Sweeney (Four Series & 2 movies) – Det. Insp. Jack Regan
1984: Mitch – Mitch
1985 to 1990: Home to Roost (Four Series) – Henry Willows
1987 to 2000: Inspector Morse (Thirty-three television films) – Detective Chief Inspector Endeavour Morse
1991: Stanley and the Women – Stanley Duke
1992: A Year in Provence – Peter Mayle
1995 to 2001: Kavanagh QC (Six Series) – James Kavanagh QC
1999: Plastic Man – Joe McConnell
2000: Monsignor Renard – Monsignor Augustine Renard
2001: The Glass – Jim Proctor

Television films

1961: Serjeant Musgrave's Dance
1963: The Lads
1964: I Can Walk Where I Like, Can't I?
1964: The Other Man
1966: The Making of Jericho
1974: Regan 
1977: Sweeney!
1978: Dinner at the Sporting Club
1980: Drake's Venture – Francis Drake
1984: Killer Waiting – Major Peter Hastings
1984: The Life and Death of King John – Hubert de Burgh
1985: We'll Support You Ever More – Geoff Hollins
1986: Stainheads
1987: "The Sign of Four" (full-length episode of The Return of Sherlock Holmes) – Jonathan Small
1989: Bomber Harris – Sir Arthur 'Bomber' Harris
1993: The Mystery of Morse
1994: The Absence of War
1996: Into the Blue – Harry Barnett
1998: Goodnight Mister Tom – Tom Oakley
1999: The Waiting Time – Joshua Mantle
2000: The Last Morse 
2000: Inspector Morse: Rest in Peace – Inspector Morse
2001: Hidden Treasure / Buried Treasure – Harry (final film role)

Guest appearances

1962 Probation Officer: Episode No. 4.4 (28 May 1962)
1963 ITV Television Playhouse: The Lads (15 August 1963)
1963 Z-Cars: A La Carte (18 September 1963)
1963 Z-Cars: Light the Blue Paper (25 September 1963)
1963 Z-Cars: A Quiet Night (2 October 1963)
1963 Z-Cars: Hide – And Go Seek (16 October 1963)
1964 The Avengers: Esprit De Corps (14 March 1964)
1965 A Poor Gentleman: Episode No. 1.1 (12 October 1965)
1965 A Poor Gentleman: Episode No. 1.2 (19 October 1965)
1965 The Edgar Wallace Mystery Theatre: Dead Man's Chest (31 October 1965)
1967 Inheritance: Murder (29 September 1967)
1967 Inheritance: A Man of His Time (1 December 1967)
1969 The Borderers: Dispossessed (25 March 1969)
1969 ITV Saturday Night Theatre: The Haunting (28 June 1969)
1969 ITV Saturday Night Theatre: The Talking Head (30 August 1969)
1969 ITV Saturday Night Theatre: In Another Country (11 October 1969)
1969 Strange Report: Report 2475: Revenge – When a Man Hates (9 November 1969)
1970 Play of the Month: Macbeth (BBC, 20 September 1970)
1970 Happy Ever After: Don't Walk Away (12 December 1970)
1971 Budgie: Sunset Mansions or Whatever Happened to Janey Baib? (25 June 1971)
1971 Armchair Theatre: Competition (5 October 1971)
1971 Suspicion: I'll Go Along with That (14 December 1971)
1971 The Onedin Line: Mutiny (24 December 1971)
1972 Pretenders: The Paymaster (9 April 1972)
1972 The Frighteners: Old Comrades (21 July 1972)
1972 Armchair Theatre: What Became of Me? (29 August 1972)
1972 ITV Playhouse: Refuge for a Hero (6 September 1972)
1972 The Adventures of Black Beauty: The Hostage (30 September 1972)
1973 The Rivals of Sherlock Holmes: The Sensible Action of Lieutenant Horst (4 March 1973)
1973 Menace: Tom (26 April 1973)
1973 BBC Play of the Month: Caucasian Chalk Circle (16 May 1973)
1973 ITV Saturday Night Theatre: Passengers (20 May 1973)
1973 The Protectors: Mauro Carpiano (28 December 1973)
1976 The Morecambe & Wise Show: 1976 Christmas Show (25 December 1976)
1977 This Is Your Life: Sheila Hancock (5 January 1977)
1978 The South Bank Show (26 November 1978)
1981 This Is Your Life: John Thaw (18 March 1981)
1982 Saturday Night Thriller: Where is Betty Buchus? (4 December 1982)
1987 Sherlock Holmes episode: The Sign of Four (portrayed Jonathan Small)

Theatrical films

1962: Smashing Day – Stan
1962: The Loneliness of the Long Distance Runner – Bosworth (uncredited)
1962: Nil Carborundum – ACI Neville Harrison
1963: Five To One – Alan Roper
1965: Dead Man's Chest
1968: The Bofors Gun – Featherstone
1970: Praise Marx and Pass the Ammunition – Dom
1970: The Last Grenade – Terry Mitchell
1972: Dr. Phibes Rises Again – Shavers
1977: Sweeney! – Det. Insp. Jack Regan
1978: Sweeney 2 – Det. Insp. Jack Regan
1981: Killing Heat – Dick Turner
1987: Cry Freedom (aka Biko – Biko Asking for Trouble) – Jimmy Kruger
1988: Business As Usual – Kieran Flynn
1992: Chaplin – Fred Karno
1996: Masculine Mescaline (short) – The Man
1998: Goodnight Mister Tom – Tom

Stage

1958 Cymbeline
1958 As You Like It
1958 The Cherry Orchard
1958 Pillars of Society
1958 The Taming of the Shrew
1958 A Winter's Tale
1958 The Lady's Not For Burning
1958 Twelfth Night
1958 Macbeth
1959 Hobson's Choice
1959 Paradise Lost
1959 Antigone
1959 Alcestis
1959 Faust
1959 The Knight of the Burning Pestle
1960 A Shred of Evidence
1960 The Wind and the Rain
1960 Staircase
1961 The Fire Raisers
1961 Chips With Everything
1961 Two into One
1962 Women Beware Women
1962 Semi-Detached (with Laurence Olivier)
1964 The Father
1967 Around The World in 80 Days
1967 Little Malcom And His Struggle Against The Eunuchs
1969 So What About Love?
1970 Random Happenings in the Hebrides by John McGrath
1971 The Lady from the Sea
1972 Chinamen
1972 The New Quixote
1972 Black And Silver
1972 The Two of Us
1973 Collaborators
1976 Absurd Person Singular
1977 The Two of Us (Revival)
1978 Night and Day
1982 Serjeant Musgrave's Dance
1983 Twelfth Night
1983 The Time of Your Life
1983 Henry VIII
1984 Pygmalion
1986 Two into One (Revival)
1988 All My Sons
1993 The Absence of War by David Hare
2001 Peter Pan as Captain Hook

Honours and awards
Won
1977 Evening Standard British Film Award – Best Actor for: Sweeney!
1990 British Academy Award – Best Actor for: "Inspector Morse"
1993 British Academy Award – Best Actor for: "Inspector Morse"
1994 CBE
1995 Aftonbladet TV Prize, Sweden – Best Foreign TV Personality – Male (Bästa utländska man)
1998 National Television Award – Most Popular Actor for: "Inspector Morse"
1998 Special Recognition Award – Most Popular Actor for: "Inspector Morse"
1999 National Television Award – Most Popular Actor for: "Goodnight, Mister Tom"
2001 National Television Award – Most Popular Actor for: "Inspector Morse" and Academy Fellowship
Nominated
1988 British Academy Award – Best Actor in a Supporting Role for: "Cry Freedom"
1991 British Academy Award – Best Actor for: "Inspector Morse"
1992 British Academy Award – Best Actor for: "Inspector Morse"
2000 National Television Award – Most Popular Actor for: "Monsignor Renard"
2002 National Television Award – Most Popular Actor for: "Buried Treasure"

A memorial bench is dedicated to Thaw within the grounds of St Paul's Covent Garden.

References

Bibliography
Hancock, Sheila (2004). The Two of Us: My Life with John Thaw. London: Bloomsbury. 
John Thaw: The Biography. Stafford Hildred and Tim Ewbank. London: Andre Deutsch.

External links

1942 births
2002 deaths
Alumni of RADA
English male television actors
English male film actors
English male stage actors
English socialists
Male actors from Manchester
BAFTA fellows
Best Actor BAFTA Award (television) winners
Commanders of the Order of the British Empire
People from Gorton
Deaths from esophageal cancer
Inspector Morse
Deaths from cancer in England
Labour Party (UK) people
People educated at Ducie Technical High School for Boys
Royal Shakespeare Company members